Women's Combined World Cup 1988/1989

Calendar

Final point standings

In Women's Combined World Cup 1988/89 both results count.

Women's Combined Team Results

bold indicate highest score - italics indicate race wins

References

External links
 

World Cup
FIS Alpine Ski World Cup women's combined discipline titles